Smoketown is an unincorporated village and census-designated place (CDP) in East Lampeter Township, Lancaster County, Pennsylvania, United States. Also known as Smoke Town, it is served by the Smoketown Airport. As of the 2010 census, it had a population of 357.

Geography
Smoketown is in east-central Lancaster County, in the eastern part of East Lampeter Township, at the intersection of Pennsylvania Route 340 (Old Philadelphia Pike) and Pennsylvania Route 896 (Eastbrook Road). It is bordered to the east by Bird-in-Hand and to the north by Witmer.

Mill Creek, a southwest-flowing tributary of the Conestoga River, forms the eastern border of Smoketown and separates it from Bird-in-Hand. Via the Conestoga River, the communities are part of the Susquehanna River watershed.

Demographics
As of the 2000 census, Smoketown had a population of 119 in an area of 0.1 square miles. 115 were white, and 4 belonged to two or more races. There were 47 housing units, making the average household size 2.53 people.

References

Census-designated places in Lancaster County, Pennsylvania
Census-designated places in Pennsylvania